Bergland may refer to:

People with the surname
 David Bergland, American libertarian activist
 Robert Bergland (1928-2018), American politician
 Tim Bergland, American ice hockey

Places
 Bergland, Austria
 Bergland, Ontario, Canada
 Bergland Township, Michigan, United States
 Bergland, Michigan, the main village in the township
 Hegyvidék or Bergland (German), a district of Budapest, Hungary